Anthony Wilford Brimley (September 27, 1934 – August 1, 2020) was an American actor. After serving in the U.S. Marine Corps and working odd jobs in the 1950s, Brimley started working as an extra and stuntman in Western films in the late 1960s. He became an established character actor in the 1970s and 1980s in films such as The China Syndrome (1979), The Thing (1982), Tender Mercies (1983), The Natural (1984), and Cocoon (1985). Brimley was known for playing characters at times much older than his age. He was the long-term face of American television advertisements for the Quaker Oats Company. He also promoted diabetes education and appeared in related television commercials for Liberty Medical.

Early life 
Anthony Wilford Brimley was born in Salt Lake City on September 27, 1934, the son of Lola (née Nelson) and real estate broker Wilford Brimley. His paternal grandfather was an Englishman from Wigan, while his paternal grandmother's parents were a Scottish couple from Glasgow. His mother was half Danish and also had English, German, Swiss, and Welsh ancestry. Prior to a career in acting, he dropped out of high school at age 14 and worked as a cowboy in Arizona, Idaho, and Nevada.

Brimley joined the Marines during the Korean War and served in the Aleutian Islands for three years. He also worked as a bodyguard for businessman Howard Hughes as well as a ranch hand, wrangler, and blacksmith. He then began shoeing horses for film and television. At the behest of his close friend and fellow actor Robert Duvall, he began acting in the 1960s as a riding extra and stunt man in westerns. In 1979, he told the Los Angeles Times that the most he ever earned in a year as an actor was $20,000. He had no formal training as an actor, and his first experience in acting in front of a live audience was in a theater group at the Los Angeles Actors' Theater.

Career

Television and films 

Brimley's onscreen breakthrough came when he was cast in the popular 1970s television series The Waltons as Walton's Mountain resident and blacksmith Horace Brimley; he made seven appearances between 1974 and 1977.

His first credited feature film performance was in The China Syndrome (1979) as Ted Spindler, a friend and coworker of plant shift supervisor Jack Godell (portrayed by Jack Lemmon). That same year, he appeared in the Robert Redford/Jane Fonda feature film "The Electric Horseman" cast as simply "The Farmer" while assisting Redford and Fonda's characters evade troopers while transporting the horse in a cattle hauler. Later, Brimley made a brief but pivotal appearance in Absence of Malice (1981) as the curmudgeonly, outspoken Assistant Attorney General James A. Wells. In the movie The Thing (1982) he played the role of Blair, the biologist of a group of men at an American research station in Antarctica who encounter a dangerous alien that can perfectly imitate other organisms.

Brimley's close friend Robert Duvall (who also appeared in The Natural) was instrumental in securing for him the role of Harry in Tender Mercies (1983). Duvall, who had not been getting along with director Bruce Beresford, wanted "somebody down here that's on my side, somebody that I can relate to." Beresford felt Brimley was too old for the part but eventually agreed to the casting. Brimley, like Duvall, clashed with the director; during one instance when Beresford tried to advise Brimley on how Harry would behave, Duvall recalled Brimley responding: "Now look, let me tell you something, I'm Harry. Harry's not over there, Harry's not over here. Until you fire me or get another actor, I'm Harry, and whatever I do is fine 'cause I'm Harry."

Brimley then appeared as Pop Fisher, world-weary manager of a slumping baseball team, in The Natural (1984). Brimley appeared in the 1984 film Country as Otis, the patriarch of a family farm, which took a sobering look at farms in crisis in the 1980s. Shortly thereafter, Brimley secured his first leading role in Ron Howard's Cocoon (1985), portraying Ben Luckett, leader of a group of geriatrics who encounter a magically reinvigorating swimming pool by their retirement home. Brimley was only 49 when he was cast in the role, and turned 50 during filming; he was at least 20 years younger than any of the actors playing the other retirement home residents. In order to look the part, Brimley bleached his hair and moustache to turn them gray, and had wrinkles and liver spots drawn on his face. He also starred in Cocoon: The Return, a 1988 sequel.

Through these and other roles, Brimley became widely known for portraying gruff or stodgy old men, most notably on the 1980s NBC drama series Our House, also starring Deidre Hall, Chad Allen and Shannen Doherty. One exception was when he played William Devasher, sinister head of security for a Mafia-associated law firm, in the Tom Cruise film The Firm (1993).

After portraying the father of Kevin Kline in In & Out (1997), Brimley retreated from Hollywood in favor of involvement in more independent productions. He made an auspicious mainstream comeback with the TNT film Crossfire Trail (2001), co-starring with Tom Selleck (whom he had previously worked with in the 1980s film High Road to China). He played an intimidating United States Postmaster General in a 1997 episode of Seinfeld ("The Junk Mail"), who forces Kramer to end his boycott of the mail service.  After several more years of independent film and TV acting, Brimley had a supporting role in Did You Hear About the Morgans? (2009), making witty exchanges with star Hugh Grant.

Commercials 
Brimley frequently appeared in commercials, including a series of commercials for Quaker Oats, a campaign which became famous for his repeating their slogan "It's the right thing to do." Developed by advertising agency Jordan, McGrath, Case & Taylor, the campaign began in 1987. Brimley appeared in numerous television advertisements for Liberty Medical, a company specializing in home delivery of medical products (including diabetes testing supplies). He appeared in commercials for the American Diabetes Association and was the voice-over for a Bryan Foods television commercial campaign.

Musical interests
Brimley has been described as "a fine singer with a warm, rich voice". In 1993, Brimley sang with the Cal State Northridge Jazz Band for a concert benefiting the college's Jazz Endowment Scholarship Fund. In 2004, he released This Time, The Dream's On Me, an album of jazz standards named after the Harold Arlen and Johnny Mercer-penned title track. He was also an accomplished harmonica player; during his 2011 appearance on The Late Late Show with Craig Ferguson, Brimley performed a lively rendition of "Oh! Susanna" much to the delight, and surprise, of Ferguson and the studio audience.

Personal life 
Brimley was a member of the Church of Jesus Christ of Latter-day Saints. He was married to Lynne Bagley from July 6, 1956, until her death in June 2000. They had four sons together: James Charles, John Michael, William Carmen, and Lawrence Dean. He married Beverly Berry on October 31, 2007. They split their time between homes in Greybull, Wyoming, and Santa Clara, Utah. In 2009, they founded the nonprofit organization Hands Across the Saddle (HATS) in the Bighorn Basin.

Diagnosed with type 2 diabetes in 1979, Brimley began working to raise awareness of the disease. The American Diabetes Association (ADA) honored him in 2008 with an award to recognize his lifetime of service. The ADA presented the award to him at the Port St. Lucie headquarters of Liberty Medical on December 19, 2008. He visited Veterans Administration hospitals and communities to advise patients on how to manage their diseases. His talks about diabetes became an internet phenomenon and a meme due to Brimley's dialectal pronunciation of "diabetes" as "diabeetus"  contrasting with his overall serious tone, although both pronunciations have been included in the Merriam-Webster Dictionary.

Brimley supported advertisements to have Utah allow horse-race gambling. He spoke against the banning of cockfighting in New Mexico on the basis of his support of individual rights. He also spoke at a 1998 Phoenix rally opposing an Arizona ballot proposition to ban cockfighting, arguing that a ban could lead to efforts to restrict the use of hunting dogs, which opponents of cockfighting called a distraction from the issue. Brimley enjoyed playing poker and played in the World Series of Poker Main Event.

Brimley lent his support to John McCain in the 2008 United States presidential election. In the days leading up to his selection for vice president, McCain jokingly stated that he would pick Brimley: "He's a former Marine and great guy and he's older than I am, so that might work."

Death 
Brimley died at a hospital in St. George, Utah, on August 1, 2020 at age 85 after suffering from a kidney condition for two months.

Filmography 
Sources:

Film

Television

Awards and nominations

References

External links 

 
 
 

1934 births
2020 deaths
Internet memes
20th-century American male actors
21st-century American male actors
American male film actors
United States Marine Corps personnel of the Korean War
American health activists
People with type 2 diabetes
American people of Danish descent
American people of English descent
American people of Scottish descent
American people of Swiss-German descent
American people of Welsh descent
Latter Day Saints from Utah
American male television actors
People from Greybull, Wyoming
Male actors from Salt Lake City
Military personnel from Salt Lake City
Utah Republicans
Wyoming Republicans
Male actors from Wyoming
Quaker Oats Company people
People from Santa Clara, Utah
United States Marines